Miravalles Solar Park, is a solar energy project located in Guanacaste Province of Costa Rica, near the Miravalles Volcano. It is operated by the Costa Rican Institute of Electricity (ICE).

It has 4300 solar panels, with an individual output of 235 W, for a combined peak total of 1.0105 MW. 

At the time of its inauguration, it was the largest solar power plant in Central America. It was constructed with funds donated by the Japan International Cooperation Agency.

References  

Solar power
Energy in Costa Rica